Countess Palatine Dorothea Catherine of Birkenfeld-Bischweiler (3 July 1634 – 7 December 1715) was a Countess Palatine of Zweibrücken-Birkenfeld-Bischweiler by birth and, by marriage, Countess of Nassau-Ottweiler.

Life 
Dorothea Catherine was born in Bischweiler, a daughter of the Count Palatine Christian I of Zweibrücken-Birkenfeld-Bischweiler (1598–1654) from his first marriage with Magdalene Catherine (1606–1648), daughter of the Count Palatine John II of Zweibrücken.

She married in 1649 in Bischweiler with Count John Louis of Nassau-Ottweiler (1625–1690), the founder of the line Nassau-Ottweiler.

After her husband's death Dorothea Catherine lived on her widow seat, Neunkirchen Castle near Ottweiler and was active in charity.  She supported the construction and maintenance of a hospital in Ottweiler by contributing substantial financial resources. She died in Neunkirchen.

Issue 
From her marriage, Dorothea Catherine had the following children:
 Christian Louis (1650-1650)
 Frederick Louis (1651–1728)
 married firstly on 28 July 1680 Countess Christiane of Ahlefeld (1659-1695)
 married secondly on 27 September 1697 Countess Louise Sophie of Hanau-Lichtenberg (1662-1751)
 Anna Catherine (1653–1731)
 married in 1671 to John Philip Wild- and Rhinegrave of Salm-Dhaun (1645-1693)
 Wolrad (1656–1705)
 Charles Siegfried (1659–1679)
 Louis (1661–1699)
 married on 9 April 1694 Countess Louise Amalie of Horne (1665-1728)
 Louise (1662–1741)
 Maurice (1664–1666)

References 
 Fried Köllner: Geschichte des vormaligen Nassau-Sarbrück'schen Landes und seiner Regenten, pp. 337, 340 ff

External links 

Countesses of Nassau
House of Wittelsbach
German countesses
1634 births
1715 deaths
17th-century German people
Daughters of monarchs